Amblyseius armeniacus is a species of mite in the family Phytoseiidae.

References

armeniacus
Articles created by Qbugbot
Animals described in 1972